Trevor Nisbett (born 13 June 1957) is an Australian businessman, executive and former Australian rules footballer, who played for South Bunbury in the South West Football League (SWFL). He is the current chief executive officer (CEO) of the West Coast Eagles in the Australian Football League (AFL).

Career
Nisbett was born and raised in Bunbury, Western Australia. He attended Bunbury Senior High School and played senior football for South Bunbury. He attended the University of Western Australia in Perth, graduating with a Bachelor of Physical Education and a Graduate Diploma of Education.

After serving as Football Manager of the East Perth Football Club for two years, Nisbett became involved with the West Coast Eagles in 1989, when he was appointed Football Manager of the club. In 1999, Nisbett was appointed CEO of the West Coast Eagles, replacing Brian Cook. In 2000, Nisbett was awarded the inaugural Australian Sports Medal, and in 2003, the inaugural Graeme Samuel Award, receiving a $20,000 award. He is also a deputy chairman of the David Wirrpanda Foundation and a member of the board of Foodbank WA.

References

1957 births
Australian businesspeople
Australian rules footballers from Western Australia
East Perth Football Club administrators
Living people
People from Bunbury, Western Australia
South Bunbury Football Club players
University of Western Australia alumni
West Coast Eagles administrators